Brazoria County is a county in the U.S. state of Texas. As of the 2020 census, the population of the county was 372,031. The county seat is Angleton.

Brazoria County is included in the Houston-The Woodlands-Sugar Land metropolitan statistical area. It is located in the Gulf Coast region of Texas.

Regionally, parts of the county are within the extreme southernmost fringe of the regions locally known as Southeast Texas. Brazoria County is among a number of counties that are part of the region known as the Texas Coastal Bend. Its county seat is Angleton, and its largest city is Pearland.  Brazoria County, like Brazos County farther upriver, takes its name from the Brazos River. It served as the first settlement area for Anglo-Texas, when the Old Three Hundred emigrated from the United States in 1821. The county also includes what was once Columbia and Velasco, Texas, early capital cities of the Republic of Texas.  The highest point in Brazoria County is Shelton's Shack, located near the Dow Chemical Plant B Truck Control Center, measuring 342 ft above sea level.

History 
Brazoria County takes its name from the Brazos River, which flows through it. Anglo-Texas began in Brazoria County when the first of Stephen F. Austin's authorized 300 American settlers arrived at the mouth of the Brazos in 1821.  Many of the events leading to the Texas Revolution developed in Brazoria County. In 1832, Brazoria was organized as a separate municipal district by the Mexican government, so became one of Texas original counties at independence in 1836.

An early resident of Brazoria County, Joel Walter Robison, fought in the Texas Revolution and later represented Fayette County in the Texas House of Representatives.

Stephen F. Austin's original burial place is located at a church cemetery, Gulf Prairie Cemetery, in the town of Jones Creek, on what was his brother-in-law's Peach Point Plantation.  His remains were exhumed in 1910 and brought to be reinterred at the state capital in Austin.  The town of West Columbia served as the first capital of Texas, dating back to prerevolutionary days.

The Hastings Oil Field was discovered by the Stanolind Oil and Gas Company in 1934. Total production by 1954 was about 242 million barrels.

Lake Jackson is a community developed beginning in the early 1940s to provide housing to workers at a new Dow Chemical Company plant in nearby Freeport. The county has elements of both rural and suburban communities, as it is part of greater Houston.

On June 2, 2016, the flooding of the Brazos River required evacuations for portions of Brazoria County.

Geography 

Adjacent counties 
Harris County (north)
Galveston County (northeast)
Gulf of Mexico (southeast)
Matagorda County (southwest)
Wharton County (west)
Fort Bend County (northwest)

National protected areas 
Brazoria National Wildlife Refuge
San Bernard National Wildlife Refuge (part)

Communities

Cities 

Alvin
Angleton (county seat)
Brazoria
Brookside Village
Clute
Danbury
Freeport
Iowa Colony
Lake Jackson
Liverpool
Manvel
Oyster Creek
Pearland (small parts in Harris and Fort Bend counties)
Richwood
Sandy Point
Surfside Beach
Sweeny
West Columbia

Towns 
Holiday Lakes
Quintana

Villages 
Bailey's Prairie
Bonney
Hillcrest
Jones Creek

Census-designated places
 Damon
 East Columbia
 Rosharon
 Ryan Acres
 Wild Peach Village

Unincorporated communities

 Amsterdam
 Anchor
 Brazosport
 Bryan Beach
 Chenango
 China Grove
 Chocolate Bayou
 Danciger
 English
 Four Corners
 Hinkle's Ferry
 Lochridge
 Old Ocean
 Otey
 Silverlake
 Snipe
 Turtle Cove

Ghost towns
 Hasima
 Hastings
 Lake Barbara
 Mims
 Oakland
 Perry Landing
 Velasco

Demographics

As of the census of 2000, 241,767 people, 81,954 households, and 63,104 families resided in the county. The population density was 174 people per square mile (67/km2). The 90,628 housing units averaged 65 per mi2 (25/km2). According to the 2010 United States census, 313,166 people were living in the county; by 2020, its population grew to 372,031.

Of the 81,955 households in 2000, 40.80% had children under the age of 18 living with them, 62.20% were married couples living together, 10.40% had a female householder with no husband present, and 23.00% were not families. About 19.10% of all households were made up of individuals, and 6.40% had someone living alone who was 65 years of age or older. The average household size was 2.82, and the average family size was 3.23.

In the county, the age distribution as 28.60% under 18, 8.60% from 18 to 24, 32.40% from 25 to 44, 21.50% from 45 to 64, and 8.80% who were 65 or older. The median age was 34 years. For every 100 females, there were 107 males. For every 100 females age 18 and over, there were 107.4 males.

The median income for a household in the county was $48,632, and for a family was $55,282. Males had a median income of $42,193 versus $27,728 for females. The per capita income for the county was $20,021. About 8.1% of families and 10.2% of the population were below the poverty line, including 12.6% of those under age 18 and 8.7% of those age 65 or over.

Race and ethnicity 
In the late 1800s the county was majority black as many were former slaves who had worked on plantations in the county. In 1882 it had 8,219 black people and 3,642 white people. However after Jim Crow laws were cemented, many African-Americans moved to Houston and the county became majority white. By 2022, due to the growth of ethnic minorities in Pearland, non-Hispanic white people were now a plurality and not a majority in the county as a whole.

Note: the U.S. Census Bureau treats Hispanic/Latino as an ethnic category. This table excludes Latinos from the racial categories and assigns them to a separate category. Hispanics/Latinos can be of any race.

In 2000, the racial makeup of the county was 77.09% White, 8.50% Black or African American, 0.53% Native American, 2.00% Asian, 9.66% from other races, and 2.22% from two or more races. About 22.78% of the population were Hispanic or Latino of any race. About 12.1% were of German, 11.2% American, and 7.2% English ancestry according to 2000's census; about 79.0% spoke only English at home, while 18.1% spoke Spanish. By 2010, 70.1% were White, 12.1% African American, 5.5% Asian, 0.6% Native American, 9.2% of some other race, and 2.6% of more than one race; about 27.7% were Hispanic or Latino (of any race).

Government and politics

Elected officials 
Nathan Haller, a black man, was the elected representative for the county from 1892 to 1897. After Jim Crow laws were imposed, black residents were suppressed politically until the Civil Rights Movement of the 1950s and 1960s.
In 2022 most major government officials were white.

United States Congress

Texas Legislature

Texas Senate

Texas House of Representatives 

Pearland native Kyle Kacal, a Republican from College Station, holds the District 12 state House seat based in Brazos and four neighboring counties.

Law enforcement and jails

The Brazoria County Sheriff's Office is the oldest law enforcement agency in the State of Texas, established by the Republic of Texas in  March 1836. Among its duties include running the Brazoria County Jail, located at 3602 County Road 45 in unincorporated central Brazoria County, north of Angleton.

The Texas Department of Criminal Justice (TDCJ) operates six state prisons for men and its Region III office in unincorporated Brazoria County. As of 2007,1,495 full-time correctional job positions were in the county. In 1995, of the counties in Texas, Brazoria had the second-highest number of state prisons and jails, after Walker County. In 2003, a total of 2,572 employees were employed at the six TDCJ facilities. The TDCJ units are:
Clemens Unit, nearBrazoria
Memorial Unit (formerly Darrington Unit), near Rosharon - The Windham School District Region III office is within the unit.
(The following 3 are co-located in Otey, near Rosharon.)
Ramsey Unit - The unit is co-located with Stringfellow and Terrell. The TDCJ Region III Maintenance Headquarters is within this unit.
Stringfellow Unit, near Rosharon - The unit is co-located with Ramsey and Terrell. The unit was originally named Ramsey II Prison Unit.
C. T. Terrell Unit - The unit is co-located with Ramsey and Stringfellow. It was originally known as the Ramsey III Unit.

In 2007, TDCJ officials said discussions to move the Central Unit from Sugar Land to Brazoria County were preliminary.

Former units:
Retrieve Unit (later Wayne Scott Unit), near Angleton. - Main prison closed in 2020

Education
A variety of school districts serve Brazoria County students. They include:
 Alvin ISD
 Angleton ISD
 Brazosport ISD
 Columbia-Brazoria ISD
 Danbury ISD
 Damon ISD
 Friendswood ISD
 Pearland ISD
 Sweeny ISD

Alvin Community College and Brazosport College serve as higher education facilities. Alvin CC serves areas in Alvin, Danbury, and Pearland ISDs as well as portions of the Angleton ISD that Alvin CC had annexed prior to September 1, 1995. Brazosport College serves the remainder of Angleton ISD and the Brazosport, Columbia-Brazoria, Damon, and Sweeny ISD areas.

The Brazoria County Library System has branches in Alvin, Angleton, Brazoria, Clute, Danbury, Freeport, Lake Jackson, Manvel, Pearland, Sweeny and West Columbia, and runs the Brazoria County Historical Museum.

Transportation

Major highways
 State Highway 6
 State Highway 35
 State Highway 36

 State Highway 288
 State Highway 332

Airports
The Texas Gulf Coast Regional Airport, in central unincorporated Brazoria County, is the county's sole publicly owned airport.

The following airports, located in the county, are privately owned and for public use:
Flyin' B Airport in western unincorporated Brazoria County
Skyway Manor Airport in Pearland
Pearland Regional Airport in eastern unincorporated Brazoria County south of the Pearland city limits

The closest airport with regularly scheduled commercial service is Houston's William P. Hobby Airport, located in southern Houston in adjacent Harris County. The Houston Airport System has stated that Brazoria County is within the primary service area of George Bush Intercontinental Airport, an international airport in Houston in Harris County.

Toll roads

The Brazoria County Toll Road Authority operates toll lanes on TX 288 inside Brazoria County. They connect to the SH 288 Express Toll Lanes in Harris County operated by the Texas Department of Transportation.

History

BCTRA came into existence in December, 2003  when it saw that the Houston area needed more roadways and wanted to have a say so about any roads that come into Brazoria County.

Roadway system

The only toll road BCTRA has in operation at this time is the Brazoria County Expressway. Located within the media of SH 288, the expressway begins at County Road 58 in Manvel and is maintained by BCTRA for five miles up to the Harris County line at Clear Creek.  The 288 Toll Lanes continue into Harris County (maintained by TxDOT) for ten miles up to I-69/US 59 in Houston.  Construction began on the Brazoria County Expressway in late 2016 and was completed on November 16, 2020. Tolls are collected electronically and an EZ Tag, TxTag or TollTag is required for passage.

See also 

List of museums in the Texas Gulf Coast
National Register of Historic Places listings in Brazoria County, Texas
Recorded Texas Historic Landmarks in Brazoria County

References

External links

Brazoria County government
Brazoria County Day website
Brazoria County FireFighters Association
Brazoria County Museum
Brazoria County Parks Department

Brazoria County from the  Texas Almanac
Brazoria County from the TXGenWeb Project
Historic materials about Brazoria County, hosted by the Portal to Texas History

 
1836 establishments in the Republic of Texas
Populated places established in 1836
Greater Houston
Majority-minority counties in Texas